Noirmoutier (also French: Île de Noirmoutier, ;) is a tidal island off the Atlantic coast of France in the Vendée department (85).

History
Noirmoutier was the location of an early Viking raid in 799, when raiders attacked the monastery of Saint Philibert of Jumièges in 799.

The Vikings established a permanent base on the island around 824, from which they could control southeast Brittany by the 840s.  In 848, they sacked Bordeaux.  From 862 until 882, Hastein used it as a base from which he raided Francia and Brittany.   

Noirmoutier was the site of several campaigns in the War of the Vendée, as well as a massacre  and the place of execution of the Royalist Generalissimo Maurice D'Elbée, who faced the firing squad seated in a chair due to wounds accumulated from an earlier battle.

St. Mary Euphrasia Pelletier was born on this island on 31 July 1796.

Geography
The island comprises ten localities and four distinct Communes of France.

Noirmoutier is referred to as the Island of Mimosas, due to the temperateness of its climate, which allows for the flowering of Acacia dealbata (mimosa) year-round. The island is predominantly salt marsh and salt banks, sand dunes and evergreen oak forests.

The communes of the island are grouped into a communauté de communes. The communes are:
 Barbâtre
 L'Épine
 La Guérinière
 Noirmoutier-en-l'Île

The island has been a site of uninterrupted human inhabitation since prehistoric times, and is a popular tourist destination.

Parts of the island have been reclaimed from the sea. In 2005 it served as the finish of the Tour de France prologue.

Transport
It is flooded twice a day by the high tide. 
Until the early 1970s, a ferry service operated across the Strait of Fromentine between the La Fosse pier on the island and Fromentine pier on the mainland. This was superseded by the construction of the Noirmoutier Bridge, inaugurated in July 1971.

Events
Every year, an international foot race; the Foulées du Gois, is held across it, starting at the onset of the high tide.

La “Fête de la Bonnotte” (Bonnotte party) is also an annual festival celebrating the first day of potato harvest on the island of Noirmoutier.

Infrastructure
In response to an effort by the French government to add offshore wind projects to the national grid, a 496 MW wind farm is being developed near the island, with a planned commissioning date of 2021.

Climate
Noirmoutier experiences an oceanic climate typical of the west coast of France. Both the winters and summers are heavily moderated by the surrounding Atlantic Ocean. There is a low degree of diurnal temperature variation throughout the year, especially in the winter. There is considerably more precipitation in winter compared to summer.

References

External links

 Tourist office website
 Google image

Tidal islands of France
Landforms of Vendée
Islands of Pays de la Loire
Ramsar sites in Metropolitan France
Poitou
Pays de la Loire region articles needing translation from French Wikipedia